Jerzy Toeplitz AO (24 November 190924 July 1995) was a Polish film educator and theorist. He was the co-founder of the Polish Film School, and later took up an appointment in Australia for the Australian Film, Television and Radio School.

Between 1948 and 1972 he was Vice-President of the International Film and Television Council (USA). In 1959, he was a member of the jury at the 1st Moscow International Film Festival. Two years later, he was a member of the jury at the 2nd Moscow International Film Festival.

He was an author and published a number of books which have been translated into many languages. Toeplitz also, for almost 30 years (1948–1971), was the president of the International Federation of Films Archives (FIAF), where he accomplished a very important role, overall in the Cold War conjuncture, especially into a very big crisis of the FIAF's history (perhaps the worst), when Henri Langlois (one of the Cinemathèquè Française's founders) left the FIAF. Toeplitz's job was a very important differential (typical of his generation) because he was a cinema's teacher and a leader of an educational project in the Polish city of Łódź (a reference into the period). This school had a decisive impact on the modern cinema in Poland.

In 1985 he was appointed an Honorary Officer of the Order of Australia for his services to Australian film. In 1986, he was a member of the jury at the 36th Berlin International Film Festival.

References

Bibliography

 History of Cinema Art Five volume set translated from Polish into Russian and German
 Film and TV in the USA Translated into Russian, Czech and Slovak
 Hollywood and After: The changing Face of American Cinema Translated into English by Boleslaw Sulik
 Borde, Raymond. Les Cinémathèques, L'Age D'Homme, 1983, Lausanne.

1909 births
1995 deaths
Film people from Kharkiv
People from Kharkov Governorate
Polish film historians
Film educators
Film theorists
Christian Peace Conference members
Honorary Officers of the Order of Australia